Joseph Polk (born August 31, 1978) is a former American football defensive back.

In his rookie season in af2 with the Tulsa Talons, Polk tripped over a fallen receiver and slammed headfirst into the padded wall that lines the field. The impact broke his C-6 vertebra, leaving him paralyzed, and unable to move his legs and temporarily without feeling in his hands. He was told that he would not be able to walk again, but he was able to get himself into a healthy enough condition to be able to play football again.

Polk went on to spend 8 years as a player in the Arena Football League. He won the 2001 Most Inspirational Player of the Year after playing his rookie season. He has also won 2 American Indoor Football Association championships playing for both the Canton Legends and the Reading Express.

References

1978 births
Living people
American football defensive backs
Northeastern State RiverHawks football players
Tulsa Talons players
Grand Rapids Rampage players
Buffalo Destroyers players
Columbus Destroyers players
Orlando Predators players
Georgia Force players
Canton Cougars players
Players of American football from Oakland, California